Boars Tusk is an isolated remains of a volcano within the Rock Springs Uplift in the Green River Basin of southwestern Wyoming.

Boars Tusk is an isolated remnant of a long extinct volcano associated with the Leucite Hills to the east. Heavily eroded, all that remains of the volcano is part of the erosion resistant  volcanic neck which is composed of the uncommon volcanic rock lamproite. Rock samples from Boars Tusk provided an age of 2.5 MA.

References

 

Landforms of Sweetwater County, Wyoming
Buttes of Wyoming